Tomich may refer to:

 Tomich (village) in the Scottish Highlands, United Kingdom
 USS Tomich (DE-242), Edsall-class destroyer escort

People with the surname

 Jared Tomich (b. 1974), American football player
 Pere Tomich, 15th century Catalan historian
 Peter Tomich (1893–1941), American navy war hero
 Tommi Tomich (b. 1980), Australian football (soccer) player

See also

 Tomić, a Slavic surname sometimes transliterated as Tomich